Epperson may refer to:

People
Asia'h Epperson (born 1988), American singer and actress
Brenda Epperson (born 1965), American actress and singer
Charlie Epperson (1919–1996), American basketball player
Don Epperson (1938–1973) American singer and actor
Frank Epperson, inventor of the Popsicle in the 1920s
Harold G. Epperson (1923-1944), American Medal of Honor holder
Jay E (Jason Lee Epperson, born 1973), American record producer and DJ
John Epperson (born 1955), American drag artist
Lia Epperson (fl. from 1999), an American civil rights lawyer and professor
A. Ralph Epperson (born 1937), American writer
Sharon Epperson, American business journalist
Stuart Epperson, American businessman and politician
Tom Epperson (fl. from 1992), American screenwriter

Other uses
, a United States Navy destroyer

See also

Epperson v. Arkansas, a 1968 United States Supreme Court case
 Epperson House, in Kansas City, Missouri, U.S.
 George Epperson House, in Jerome, Idaho, U.S.